Elisa Peres (born 17 November 1963) is an Angolan handball player.

She competed at the 1996 Summer Olympics, where Angola placed 7th.

References

External links
 

1963 births
Living people
Angolan female handball players
Olympic handball players of Angola
Handball players at the 1996 Summer Olympics